Broughtonia is a genus of orchids (family Orchidaceae) native to the Bahamas and the Greater Antilles. The genus is abbreviated Bro in trade journals.

Species
As presently constituted (May 2014), Broughtonia consists of 6 accepted natural species plus one recognized nothospecies.

Natural Hybrids

The haploid chromosome number of one species, B. sanguinea, has been determined as n = 20.

References 

 Nir, M. Orchidaceae Antillanae, 49–52, 2000.

Laeliinae
Laeliinae genera
Epiphytic orchids
Flora of Cuba